The 2009–10 Saint Louis Billikens men's basketball team represented Saint Louis University in the 2009–10 college basketball season. This was head coach Rick Majerus's third season at Saint Louis. The Billikens compete in the Atlantic 10 Conference and played their home games at Chaifetz Arena. They finished the season 23–13, 11–5 in A-10 play and lost in the quarterfinals of the 2010 Atlantic 10 men's basketball tournament. They were invited to the 2010 College Basketball Invitational where they advanced to the best-of-3 games final. They lost 0–2 to VCU.

2009-10 Roster

Schedule and results

|-
!colspan=9 style=| Exhibition

|-
!colspan=9 style=| Regular Season

|-
!colspan=9 style=| Atlantic 10 tournament

|-
!colspan=9 style=| CBI

References

Saint Louis
Saint Louis Billikens men's basketball seasons
Saint Louis
Saint
Saint